Eilema incertula is a moth of the subfamily Arctiinae. It was described by Hervé de Toulgoët in 1972. It is found on Madagascar.

References

incertula
Moths described in 1972